Pugachev's Oak is a major tree in Marii Chodra national park, Mari El Republic, Russian Federation.

Legend says that after the defeat in the battle of Kazan and retreat to the Mari forests, the rest of Pugachev's troops stayed under the oak, and Pugachev personally watched the burning of Kazan from this oak. However, there are doubts that the particular oak is the tree Pugachev's rebels stayed under, and some researchers consider that tree is estimated to date to about 1650 and at the time of Pugachev revolt it was an ordinary tree. Another major oak tree, estimated to date to about 1400 existed in the nearby fields until the 1940s, when it died and was sawed in the 1950s. It was possibly the original Pugachev's Oak.

References

Individual oak trees
Environment of Mari El
Individual trees in Russia